Choi Young-jun is the name of:
 Choi Young-jun (footballer, born 1965), South Korean footballer
 Choi Young-jun (footballer, born 1991), South Korean footballer
 Choi Young-joon (born 1980), South Korean actor